Vevay Park is an unincorporated community in Cumberland County, Illinois, United States.

The community was established about 1869 by the Vandalia Railroad, and called "Long Point Station".  Grant Pickett, who operated a pumping station for the railroad, renamed the town after his former home of Vevay, Indiana.

A post office was established in 1883 and named "Vevay"; the name was changed to Vevay Park in 1887.

References

Unincorporated communities in Cumberland County, Illinois
Unincorporated communities in Illinois